Coliseum Records was a British record label, which was in business between 1912 and 1927. The issues were mainly dance records made from Gennett, Vocalion and other labels' masters.

References

British record labels
Record labels established in 1912
1912 establishments in the United Kingdom